Abdel Wahed Ben Siamar Mimun (born 1941) is a Moroccan basketball player. He competed in the men's tournament at the 1968 Summer Olympics.

References

1941 births
Living people
Moroccan men's basketball players
Olympic basketball players of Morocco
Basketball players at the 1968 Summer Olympics
People from Nador